Lake 3.1416 is a small lake in the municipality Rivière-aux-Outardes, Quebec, Canada, in the administrative region Côte-Nord.

The lake gets its name from the fact that three property owners have a camp that is 14 feet wide and 16 feet long.

See also
 List of lakes of Quebec
 The number pi.

References 

3.1416